Kai Asa Savon Wright (born October 1, 1991), known by his stage name Sango, is an American DJ and record producer from Seattle, Washington.

Personal life 
Sango was born October 1, 1991, in Bremerton, Washington. His parents were both musicians. He relocated to Grand Rapids, Michigan at age nine. In 2015, he graduated from Western Michigan University with a BFA in graphic design. Shortly after graduating, he relocated to Seattle. His professional name comes from the lead female character in the anime/manga Inuyasha.

In 2015, Wright married Angela Lopez-Wright. In September 2016, Wright announced the birth of their first child, born on September 17, 2016; a boy.

Style and influences
Sango produces music across multiple genres, but primarily makes dance music  that heavily samples jazz and soul, in keeping with the rest of the Soulection collective. His main genres are house, techno, and hip-hop. Sango has contributed production to projects from R&B singers Tinashe, Ravyn Lenae, and Bryson Tiller; pop singers PinkPantheress and Christina Aguilera; and rappers Wale, MadeinTYO, and Smino.

Sango's music is largely influenced by his experience growing up on the internet, synthesizing various disparate influences. Chief among his artistic influences is LA jazz/electronic producer Flying Lotus, whom he discovered as a teenager. Sango frequently cites his parents, both of whom were musicians, as being a large part of why he began making music. His mothera pianist, trumpeter, and drummeris featured on his debut album "North" on the song "Until Saturday," which also features Australian producer Ta-ku. The album "Also Tracey" is named for and dedicated to her as well.

The nation of Brazil is also a strong influence on his music, with much of his music incorporating elements of baile funk. His initial introduction to the genre was through the Call of Duty video game series. He has also noted his love of dancehall music.

Sango has cited Kaytranada, Mount Kimbie, James Blake, Timbaland, J Dilla, The Neptunes, DJ Quik, Drake producer Noah "40" Shebib, Madlib, the aforementioned Flying Lotus, and Jake One as the producers with the most influence on his music.

Discography

Studio Albums 
North (2013)
In the Comfort Of (2018)

Extended Plays 
Unfinished & Satisfied (2010)
As Always (2011)
Sounds of Chimera (2011)
Also Tracey (2011)
There's Eugene (2011)
Trust Me (2012)
Otra Vez (2012)
Da Rocinha (2012)
Until Then (w/ Waldo) (2014)
Da Rocinha 2 (2014)
Hours Spent Loving You (w/ Xavier Omär) (2015)
2009–2012 Tapes (2015)
Da Rocinha 3 (2015)
Mais Mais Mais (2016)
Tomorrow (w/ Dave B.) (2016)
De Mim, Pra Você (2017)
Make Me Well (2019)
Acima (w/ VHOOR) (2019)
Calder Program Series 1-3 (2019)
Moments Spent Loving You (w/ Xavier Omär) (2019)
Grove (w/ Waldo & Savon) (2019)
Fufu & Grits (w/ Juls) (2020)
SANGOZINHO (2020)
Da Rocinha 4 (2020)
SHANGO (2020)
MearlGo (w/ Earlly Mac) (2021)
MearlGo Vol. 2 (w/ Earlly Mac) (2021)
Lake Effect (w/ Waldo) (2021)
MearlGo Vol. 3 (w/ Earlly Mac) (2021)
Great Lakes Influence (2022)

Mixtapes 
More Balloons (The Weeknd Remixes) (2011)

Remixes 
Frank Ocean – "Cayendo"

References 

1991 births
Living people
American electronic musicians
American experimental musicians
Record producers from Washington (state)
Musicians from Seattle
American DJs
Electronic dance music DJs